Freudenberg IT SE & Co. KG is an IT company specializing in SAP consulting, outsourcing, manufacturing execution system & managed hosting. It is part of the Freudenberg Group. Freudenberg IT is operating out of 18 locations in Europe, North America, China and South East Asia with over 600 associates. Freudenberg IT is headquartered at Weinheim, Germany. 

An association with SAP started when Freudenberg became number seven customer of SAP and SAP R1 was installed on Freudenberg systems.

History
Freudenberg IT started as an IT spinoff in year 1995.

Freudenberg IT (FIT) is part of Freudenberg Group of companies. Around 1995, Freudenberg Group was faced with a question many companies encounter: that of whether to transfer its in-house IT services to a third party. The group made a decision to take a different path by achieving legal independence and entering into business transactions with third parties i.e. becoming an IT spinoff. An independent entity Freudenberg Informatik KG was created which was later renamed as Freudenberg IT. Today Freudenberg IT or FIT is Germany's IT spinoff, realizing more than three-fourths of its revenue from external customers.

In Germany Freudenberg IT is located at Weinheim, Balingen, Düsseldorf, Munich and Hamburg. Their first office outside Germany was in Barcelona, Spain. Later they established offices at Budapest, Hungary and Kiev, Ukraine. In North America, Freudenberg IT is present in Philadelphia, Detroit, Atlanta, Raleigh – Durham, Los Angeles, Mexico City and Halifax, Canada. In China they are present in Beijing, Shanghai, Suzhou and Guangzhou. In 2009 Freudenberg IT established an office in Singapore to act as a hub for customers in South East Asia.

In November 2001 Freudenberg IT purchased 75% stake in Adicom, the systems enterprise provider based in Balingen, Germany. With this acquisition Freudenberg IT was able to complement its SAP service suite with a manufacturing execution system product. As a MES system, Adicom is able to operate as a standalone system or in conjunction with any ERP system.

In 2009, Freudenberg IT crossed US$100 million in annual revenue.

From 2010 to 2014, TechCatalyst, a Mumbai-based IT company, provided offshore IT support to Freudenberg IT's SAP managed hosting customers. In 2014, Freudenberg IT terminated its offshore IT support partnership with TechCatalyst India, and established its own IT support company.

Syntax, a Montreal-based provider of cloud and managed IT services to businesses, officially acquired SAP cloud specialist firm Freudenberg IT (FIT) on March 1, 2019 (after 6 weeks of customary approvals).

References

International information technology consulting firms
Outsourcing companies
Software companies of Germany